The Alamo Hotel is a building in Colorado Springs, Colorado, United States, which is listed on the National Register of Historic Places.  The hotel was constructed in 1886 and then renovated in 1890 and 1899, and served as a traveling stop for ordinary travelers and salesmen. The hotel was converted to apartments in 1968 and is now used to house shops in addition to apartments. The property was listed in 1977.

Sometime after the Colorado Springs Urban Renewal Authority purchased the property in 1974, it was renovated, and several portions of the structure were completely removed, leaving only the south portion and the north tower.

See also
National Register of Historic Places listings in El Paso County, Colorado

References 

Buildings and structures in Colorado Springs, Colorado
Hotel buildings on the National Register of Historic Places in Colorado
National Register of Historic Places in Colorado Springs, Colorado

Hotel buildings completed in 1886
1886 establishments in Colorado
Federal architecture in Colorado